Center Township is one of fourteen townships in Dearborn County, Indiana. As of the 2010 census, its population was 5,318 and it contained 2,267 housing units.

History
Center Township was organized in 1839.

Laughery Creek Bridge, River View Cemetery, and Veraestau are listed on the National Register of Historic Places.

Geography

Cities and towns
 Aurora (vast majority)

Unincorporated towns
 Cochran
 Texas
 Utah
 Westside
(This list is based on USGS data and may include former settlements.)

Major highways
  U.S. Route 50
  State Road 56
  State Road 148
  State Road 350

Cemeteries
The township contains one cemetery, Riverview.

Education
Center Township residents may obtain a library card at the Aurora Public Library in Aurora.

References
 
 United States Census Bureau cartographic boundary files

External links

 Indiana Township Association
 United Township Association of Indiana

Townships in Dearborn County, Indiana
Townships in Indiana
1839 establishments in the United States
Populated places established in 1839